The 2018 NBA Awards were the 2nd annual awards show by the National Basketball Association (NBA), held on June 25, 2018 at Barker Hangar in Santa Monica, California and hosted by Anthony Anderson. James Harden of the Houston Rockets was awarded the NBA Most Valuable Player Award.

During the ceremony, it was revealed during EJ's Neat-O Stat of the Night that the cover athlete of NBA Live 19 will be Joel Embiid.

Winners and finalists
The full list of finalists were announced on May 16, 2018 during the TNT NBA Tip-Off pre-game show and posted to Twitter.

Winners are in boldface.

Honors

NBA All-Defensive Team

NBA All-Rookie Team

Fan Awards
Fan Awards nominees and categories were announced on the league's official website on April 18, 2018.

Winners are in boldface.

Performances
 Travis Scott: "Watch", "Butterfly Effect", "Goosebumps"

See also
List of National Basketball Association awards

References

External links

NBA Awards
2017–18 NBA season
2018 awards in the United States
2018 sports awards
2010s in Los Angeles County, California
2018 in California